The Battle of the Day River (French: bataille du Day) took place between late May and early June 1951, around the Day River Delta in the Gulf of Tonkin. Part of the First Indochina War, the battle was the first conventional campaign of Võ Nguyên Giáp, and saw his Việt Minh People's Army of Vietnam (VPA) forces tackle the Catholic-dominated region of the Delta in order to break its resistance to Việt Minh infiltration. On the back of two defeats at similar ventures through March and April that year, Giap led three divisions in a pattern of guerrilla and diversion attacks on Ninh Bình, Nam Định, Phủ Lý and Phat Diem beginning on May 28 which saw the destruction of commando François, a naval commando.

The French army, under Jean de Lattre de Tassigny, who lost his son in the first day of the battle at Ninh Bình, mobilised three mobile groups (similar to regimental combat teams) and two paratrooper battalions as well as one dinassaut, and the ebb and flow of captured and retaken positions continued until Giap's supply lines were cut around June 6. His forces, moving in large numbers and during daylight, were vulnerable to French firepower and to French ground forces supported by a friendly local Catholic militia. The Việt Minh army units were forced into withdrawing between June 10 and June 18, leaving 1,000 prisoners to the French and 9,000 casualties.

Notes

References

See also 
 Battle of Mang Yang pass for the usual composition of a groupement mobile

Battles involving Vietnam
Battles involving France
Battles and operations of the First Indochina War
Conflicts in 1951
Vietnamese independence movement
1951 in Vietnam
1951 in French Indochina
May 1951 events in Asia
History of Ninh Bình Province
History of Nam Định Province
History of Hà Nam Province